Ancasti is a  department located in the southern part of Catamarca Province in Argentina.

References

External links
Ancasti webpage (Spanish)

Departments of Catamarca Province